Golapi Golapi is a 2014 Odia film directed by Susant Mani.  It stars Amlan Das and Riya Dey in lead roles while Siddhanta Mahapatra and Aparajita Mohanty play supporting roles.

Cast
 Amlan Das as Aditya
 Mihir Das as Aditya's Father
 Deepani as Rashmi
 Riya Dey as Shweta
 Jagyaseni as Jinni
 Siddhanta Mahapatra as Love Guru Prem
 Meenakshi as Aditya's Mother
 Aparajita Mohanty as Shweta's Mother
 Prutiviraj Nayak as Shweta's Father
 Jiban Panda as Lecturer

Music

 Music Director - Bikash Das
 Music Coordinator - Prafulla Behera
 Lyricist - Srikant Gautam
 Male Vocals - Udit Narayan, Babul Supriyo, Krishna Beura and Vinod Rathod
 Female Vocals - Nivedita

Track Listing 
 Golapi Golapi (Title Song)
 Sima Deingale
 Sata Bhala Paiba Re
 Rangila Rangila
 Jharaphula
 Nija Rakta
 E Ki Chhuaan

References

External links 

2014 films
2010s Odia-language films
Films directed by Susant Mani